Pope & Talbot, Inc. was a lumber company and shipping company founded by Andrew Jackson Pope and Frederic Talbot in 1849 in San Francisco, California. Pope and Talbot came to California in 1849 from East Machias, Maine. Pope & Talbot lumber company was very successful, with the high demand of the 1849 Gold Rush.

History
To ship product Pope & Talbot acquired ships. In 1852, Pope & Talbot opened a lumberyard and at Port Gamble, Washington started construction of a lumber mill and start the firm Puget Mill Company.  To feed the mill Pope & Talbot purchased timberland, by 1892 owning 186,000 acres. In 1925, the Puget Mill Company mill was sold to Charles R. McCormick Lumber Company. In 1938, the Pope & Talbot families owned the mill again after McCormick was unable to make payments. In 1940, the Puget Mill Company was renamed Pope & Talbot, Inc. Pope & Talbot, Inc. was active in supporting the World War II effort with lumber and ship. The mill ran 24/7 for the war. In 1963, Pope & Talbot exited the shipping trade and sold off the remaining four ships in the Pope & Talbot fleet. In 1972 Pope & Talbot went public, selling stocks. In 1978 Pope & Talbot open a pulp plant in Halsey, Oregon, kraft pulp mill. In 1992, Pope & Talbot purchased a sawmill in Castlegar, British Columbia. Sawmill at Port Gamble is closed in 1995, after 142 years of use.  In 1999, Pope & Talbot purchased Harmac Pacific in Nanaimo, British Columbia. In 2001, Pope & Talbot purchased Norske Skog Canada's Mackenzie River pulp in British Columbia. Pope & Talbot as both a pulp / paper line and lumber - wood line. Lumber mills are in South Dakota and three in British Columbia. Andrew Jackson Pope was born on Jan. 6, 1820, in East Machias, Maine, and died on Dec. 18, 1878, in San Francisco. Frederic Talbot was born on February 26, 1819, in  East Machias, Maine and died on December 20, 1907, in San Francisco.

World War II
Pope & Talbot fleet of ships that were used to help the World War II effort. During World War II Pope & Talbot operated Merchant navy ships for the United States Shipping Board. During World War II Pope & Talbot was active with charter shipping with the Maritime Commission and War Shipping Administration. Pope & Talbot operated Liberty ships and Victory ships for the merchant navy. The ship was run by its Pope & Talbot crew and the US Navy supplied United States Navy Armed Guards to man the deck guns and radio.

Ships

SS Absaroka
SS China Victory, as 	SS P & T. Leader starting in 1951
USS Mendocino (APA-100) 
SS Saginaw Victory
SS Brainerd Victory
Cyrus Walker 1864 Tug
Goliah 1849 Tug
SS Saginaw Victory
USS Sitka (APA-113)

Liberty ships operated:
 George A. Pope
 George B. Porter
 Laura Bridgman
 Joe Fellows
 John Roach
 Ada Rehan
 Allen C. Balch
 Charles A. McCue
 Charles Robinson
 William Allen White
 West Portal, on Feb. 5, 1943 torpedoed by German submarine U-413
 Brander Matthews
 Russell R. Jones
 James A. Wilder
 Henry Villard
Victory ships operated:
SS Seton Hall Victory
SS Twin Falls Victory
SS Provo Victory
 Brainerd Victory

See also

World War II United States Merchant Navy
Swanee Paper

References 

Defunct shipping companies of the United States
American companies established in 1849